Heather Bellson is a television producer and writer. She is most recognized for her work on the AMC series The Walking Dead.

Producer 
The Walking Dead (as a co-producer)
 5.01 "No Sanctuary"
 5.02 "Strangers"
 5.03 "Four Walls and a Roof"
 5.04 "Slabtown"
 5.05 "Self Help"
 5.06 "Consumed"
 5.07 "Crossed"
 5.08 "Coda"
 5.09 "What Happened and What's Going On"
 5.10 "Them"
5.11 “The Distance”
5.12 “Remember”
5.13 “Forget”
5.14 “Spend”
5.15 “Try”
5.16 “Conquer”

The Walking Dead (as producer)

6.01 “First Time Again”
6.02 “JSS”
6.03 “Thank You”
6.04 “Here's Not Here”
6.05 “Now”
6.06 “Always Accountable”
6.07 “Heads Up”
6.08 “Start to Finish”
6.09 “No Way Out”
6.10 “The Next World”
6.11 “Knots Untie”
6.12 “Not Tomorrow Yet”
6.13 “The Same Boat”
6.14 “Twice as Far”
6.15 “East”
6.16 “Last Day on Earth”

The Exorcist (as supervising producer)

 1.01
 1.02
 1.03
 1.04
 1.05
 1.06
 1.07
 1.08
 1.09
 1.10

The Exorcist (as co-executive producer)

 2.01
 2.02
 2.03
 2.04
 2.05
 2.06
 2.07
 2.08
 2.09
 2.10

American Gods (as co-executive producer)

 2.01
 2.02
 2.03
 2.04
 2.05
 2.06
 2.07
 2.08
 2.09
 2.10

Raised by Wolves (as co-executive producer)

 1.01
 1.02
 1.03
 1.04
 1.05
 1.06
 1.07
 1.08
 1.09
 1.10

Writer 
The Sandman
1.07 "The Doll's House"
The Walking Dead
 5.05 "Self Help" (co-written with Seth Hoffman)
 5.10 "Them"
 6.06 "Always Accountable"
 10.21 "Diverged"
Unforgettable
 1.07 "Road Block" (co-written with Christal Henry)
 1.17 "Blind Alleys" (co-written with Erik Oleson)
Black Sails
 1.06 "VI."
 2.01 “IX.”
 2.02 “X.”
 2.02 “XI.”
 2.03 “XI.”
 2.04 “XII.”
 2.05 “XIII.”
 2.06 “XIV.”
 2.07 “XV.”
 2.08 “XVI.”
 2.09 “XVII.”
 2.10 “XVIII.”
‘’The Exorcist’’
 1.02 “Chapter Two: Lupus in Fabula”
 2.01 “Janus”
 2.08 “A Heaven of Hell”
’’American Gods’’
 2.03 “Munnin”
 2.15 “Treasure of the Sun”

“Raised by Wolves”

 1.05

References

External links
 

American television writers
American television producers
American women television producers
Living people
American women television writers
Year of birth missing (living people)
21st-century American women